Babi Island (literally meaning Pig Island) is an island located in Aceh, Indonesia.

Overview 
Babi Island is located off the coast of Sumatra, not far from the Banyak Islands and Lasia Island and between Bangkuru and Simeulue Islands. It is uninhabited. It is administratively part of Simeulue Regency, Aceh.

History 
Babi was affected by the 2005 Nias–Simeulue earthquake. They also reported that the earthquake caused  of uplift, which dried the mangrove swamp on the island.

References 
Footnotes

Bibliography
 
 
 
 
 

Uninhabited islands of Indonesia